Dante Manuel Osorio Villanueva (born August 7, 1993, in Valle de Bravo, State of Mexico) is a Mexican professional footballer who last played for Correcaminos UAT.

References

External links
 
 

1993 births
Living people
Association football forwards
Potros UAEM footballers
Club Celaya footballers
Correcaminos UAT footballers
Ascenso MX players
Liga Premier de México players
Tercera División de México players
Footballers from the State of Mexico
Mexican footballers